The Blue Exile is a 1993 Turkish drama film directed by Erden Kıral. The film was selected as the Turkish entry for the Best Foreign Language Film at the 66th Academy Awards, but was not accepted as a nominee.

The film is inspired by the autobiographical memoir, also titled , of Cevat Şakir Kabaağaçlı, who wrote under the pen name Halikarnas Balıkçısı – the Fisherman of Halicarnassus.

Cast
 Can Togay as Cevat Şakir
 Hanna Schygulla as The Actress
 Özay Fecht
 Tatiana Papamoschou
 Ayse Romey as Hatice

See also
 List of submissions to the 66th Academy Awards for Best Foreign Language Film
 List of Turkish submissions for the Academy Award for Best Foreign Language Film

References

External links
 

1993 films
1993 drama films
Turkish drama films
1990s Turkish-language films
Films directed by Erden Kıral
Golden Orange Award for Best Film winners